Khutelchalcis is an extinct genus of chalcid wasp, it is the only member of the family Khutelchalcididae. It is only known from a single species, (Khutelchalcis gobiensis) described from the Early Cretaceous Tsagaantsav Formation of Mongolia.

References

Chalcidoidea
Prehistoric insect families